Sudesh Lehri (born 27 October 1968) is an Indian stand-up comedian from Punjab, India, who often perform in humour related shows on Indian television and live stage shows.

He participated in the 2007 comedy show The Great Indian Laughter Challenge III in 2007. He placed third in the show after Kapil Sharma and Chandan Prabhakar. Afterwards, Lehri played in the show Comedy Circus as a contestant partnering with Krushna Abhishek. Together, they won three seasons and quickly garnered popularity as "Krushna-Sudesh". The duo appeared on Comedy Nights Bachao, Comedy Nights Live, and Comedy Nights Bachao Taaza. His latest show is The Drama Company on Sony Entertainment Television, in which he appears with Bollywood actor Mithun Chakraborty.

Filmography 
He has appeared in several Punjabi and Hindi films.

Television shows 

Television series

References

External links
 
 

Living people
Indian male comedians
Indian stand-up comedians
Male actors in Punjabi cinema
Male actors in Hindi cinema
21st-century Indian male actors
1968 births